Chet Catallo (born March 11, 1953) is an American jazz guitarist known for his work as a member of the band Spyro Gyra.

Music career
In 1978, Catallo joined the group Spyro Gyra while they were recording the album Morning Dance. This record featured his composition "It Doesn't Matter". With Spyro Gyra he earned six Grammy Award nominations. He composed and performed the songs Loving You (from Catching the Sun) and Cafe Amore (from Carnaval). In 1986 he formed the band Chet Catallo and the Cats, who released the album First Take in 2010.

Gear
Catallo plays a Gibson Custom Shop Model Guitar, a Chet Catallo signature Custom 335 Dot Model Series 1958 reissue.

Discography
Solo
 First Take

With Spyro Gyra
 Spyro Gyra (1978)
 Morning Dance, (MCA, 1979)
 Catching the Sun, (MCA, 1980)
 Carnaval, (MCA, 1980)
 Freetime, (MCA, 1981)
 Incognito, (MCA, 1982)
 City Kids, (MCA, 1983)
 Access All Areas, (MCA 1984)

References

External links
 Official site

1954 births
Living people
Guitarists from New York (state)
20th-century American guitarists
20th-century American male musicians
American jazz educators
American jazz guitarists
American male guitarists
American session musicians
Jazz fusion guitarists
American male jazz musicians
Smooth jazz guitarists
Spyro Gyra members
MCA Records artists